Cephalotaxus lanceolata is a coniferous tree in the family Taxaceae. It is native to northern Burma and southern China. It is often considered a variety of C. fortunei.

References

Flora of China
lanceolata
Vulnerable plants